Henry, known as Enrico Pescatore (i.e., the fisherman), was a Genoese adventurer, privateer and pirate active in the Mediterranean at the beginning of the thirteenth century. His real name is said to have been Erico or Arrigo di Castro or del Castello di Candia.

The title Count of Malta was created by Tancred of Sicily some years before, for Margaritus of Brindisi and then was taken over by Emperor Henry VI, Tancred's opponent in Southern Italy and Sicily. Henry’s irregular acquisition of the title is attributed to his relationship as son-in-law to the previous holder, Guglielmo Grasso, Henry VI's and then Emperor Frederick II’s admiral, around 1204.

From 1206, Pescatore took control of large parts of Crete. After the dissolution of the Byzantine Empire by the Fourth Crusade, the island of Crete was initially allotted to Boniface of Montferrat, who soon accepted an offer from Enrico Dandolo and sold his rights to Venice. As Venice was not prepared to enforce her control over the island, Pescatore seized the opportunity and landed on Crete. However, Venice responded by sending troops and Pescatore was pushed out of the island a few years later. The Genoese held onto Chania, and in 1211 his fellow Genoese, Alamanno da Costa, began a campaign against Crete.

He was employed with imperial galleys in the Eastern Mediterranean, in particular in 1225 transporting Yolande of Jerusalem to marry the Emperor Frederick.

References
David Abulafia. Henry count of Malta and his Mediterranean activities: 1203-1230, in Italy, Sicily and the Mediterranean, 1100-1400 (1987)

Notes

13th-century Genoese people
Genoese admirals
Medieval pirates
People of medieval Crete
Rulers of Crete
Counts of Malta
Christians of the Fifth Crusade